The 1974 Kansas Jayhawks football team represented the University of Kansas in the Big Eight Conference during the 1974 NCAA Division I football season. In their fourth and final season under head coach Don Fambrough, the Jayhawks compiled a 4–7 record (1–6 against conference opponents), tied for last place in the conference, and were outscored by their opponents by a combined total of 247 to 157. They played their home games at Memorial Stadium in Lawrence, Kansas.

The team's statistical leaders included Scott McMichael with 1,044 passing yards, Laverne Smith with 1,181 rushing yards and Emmett Edwards with 542 receiving yards. Robert Miller and Steve Towle were the team captains.

Schedule

Roster

Team players in the NFL

References

Kansas
Kansas Jayhawks football seasons
Kansas Jayhawks football